Punta Mita is a  private peninsula that is home to the Four Seasons Punta Mita, St. Regis Punta Mita, and 16 sub-communities. There is evidence of prehistoric (pre-contact) human settlement in Nayarit. On the Punta Mita peninsula, a hilltop archaeological site known as Careyeros Hill has been dated to c. 800 AD.

Punta Mita is surrounded on three sides by nine and a half miles of Pacific Ocean beaches and coves including Litibu Bay.

Punta Mita is at the same latitude as the Hawaiian Islands. Because of its mild tropical climate, Punta Mita is a popular vacation spot.

The Islas Marietas National Park is a 15-minute boat ride from Punta Mita.

Entrepreneurial ecosystem
In November 2012, several prominent Silicon Valley entrepreneurs and investors who own properties in the area, including Wendell Brown, Mike Maples, Tim Ferriss, and Taro Gold launched a structured mentoring program and early-stage seed fund in partnership with the MITA Institute and Tech Accelerator. The MITA Institute hosts an annual "Tech Talks" conference in Punta Mita, which brings together venture capital and tech leaders from both the U.S. and Mexico.

Through his Cascade Investment, Bill Gates acquired the Punta Mita Four Seasons resort and adjacent land for $200 million in 2014, reportedly with the aim of attracting even more technology executives to the region.

In popular culture
Casa Tau was the filming location for Too Hot to Handle, a reality television dating show that was released on Netflix on 17 April 2020.

Climate

Punta Mita has a tropical wet and dry climate (Köppen Aw) featuring stable, warm temperatures all year round, with two marked seasons, a dry season from November through May, and a wet season from June through October, during this season hurricanes may threaten the village. UV radiation levels are high all year round, ranging from 7 in January and December, to 11+ between April and September. From mid-May to mid-November the heat and humidity can be uncomfortable in Punta Mita.  The most comfortable weather in Punta Mita generally occurs from late December to the end of March.

See also
 Sayulita

References

Populated places in Nayarit